Innocenzo Bonelli was Captain Regent of San Marino in 1877. He served his term along with Andrea Barbieri.

Year of birth missing
Year of death missing
Captains Regent of San Marino
Members of the Grand and General Council